Monatshefte für Chemie - Chemical Monthly is a journal covering recent research from all branches of chemistry. It was originally conceived as an Austrian journal, but has evolved into an international journal covering all branches of chemistry.

References

Publications established in 1880
Chemistry journals
English-language journals
Monthly journals
Springer Science+Business Media academic journals